Poganaya molodyozh (Nasty/Filthy Youth) is the first studio album by the Russian band Grazhdanskaya Oborona. The album was released in 1985. It was recorded concurrently with its follow-up Optimizm.

Even though the copyright date on the album states 1985, the album was recorded in 1988. There is a long and involved history as to why. The original versions of Poganaya molodezh and Optimizm were recorded in 1984 with Egor Letov and Konstantin Ryabinov (Kuzya UO, Кузя УО) and intended to be a Posev album. In late 1984, when the KGB found out about Poganaya molodezh, the band was forcibly broken up; Kuzya UO was conscripted into the army and Letov was sent to a mental asylum. Three months later, on 8 December 1984, Letov was released. The KGB ordered him to destroy the masters, but the albums were already circulating.

In 1988, after Letov finished his army service, he decided to reconstruct Poganaya molodezh and Optimizm. On 12 January of that year, Letov started re-recording both albums. He also included recordings from Posev's final album Reggae, Punk and Rock 'n Roll and a few tracks recorded in July 1985 at the House of Culture "Zvezdny". The project was finished on the 22nd of that month. These re-recordings are now the most common versions.

Egor Letov played all instruments on the 1988 album. The 1985 album had Letov on vocals and bass and Kuzya Ryabinov on drums and backing vocals. The album had no cover until the 1999 release on XOP, because it was originally distributed via Magnitizdat.

On the 2011 vinyl reissue, it was incorrectly released with the wrong track list on the gatefold (left over from the Misteria reissue). The mistake was realized and two stickers were added to the shrinkwrap: one with the correct track list and another with a note from Natalia Chumakova stating the tracks appearing on the album were recorded in 1988.

Track list 

For unspecified reasons, "Nenavizhu zhenshchin" was left off the vinyl and replaced with "Blues (nikak ne nazyvaetsya)", which had previously appeared on "Khorosho!!" and the 1999 XOP/Moroz reissue of Poganaya molodezh. "V sadike" later appeared on the 2007 CD reissue of Istoriya: Posev 1982-1985 on Misteria Zvuka.

Original version 
 Ya blyuyu na vashi tela
 Nenavizhu zhenshchin
 Detsky mir
 Matushka
 Poganaya molodezh
 Ne smeshno
 Ya vyduman naproch
 Ya bespolezen
 Daite
 Ey, babishcha blevani
 Mama blya
 Na nashikh glazakh
 Detsky doktor skazal: "Nishtyak"
 Sumasshedshy
 Khvatit!
 Ponos apofeoz

External links 
 Poganaya molodyozh' at Discogs (list of versions)

1985 debut albums
Grazhdanskaya Oborona albums